= SouthPark Church =

Christian church in Charlotte, North Carolina, U.S.

Coordinates: 35°9′4″N 80°49′38″W

SouthPark Church formerly known as Sharon United Methodist Church, is a Christian Church in the Methodist Denomination located in Charlotte, North Carolina, US. The church was famous for its "ski slope" arch in the front part of the Church on its previous building. Now, SouthPark Church is famous for its bold plan to redevelop its property into a mixed-used development by bringing in partners Childress Klein. The new Church will sit in the middle of the property surrounded by local business. SouthPark Church currently meets at Regal Phillips Place on Sunday mornings, with two services: a traditional service at 9:00 am and a modern service at 10:30 am.

== About the Church ==
"We want to help those around us live life to the full. We are currently building a development for the new home of SouthPark Church, launching the ‘Love SouthPark’ initiative, a project to create a place where the church and community intersect. SouthPark Church believes that love transforms, and we want to be present in our SouthPark community in big ways. Jesus inspires us, especially when He says, “I have come that they may have life, and have it to the full” (John 10:10). We are a group of imperfect people seeking to live abundant, full lives. Full life is all about loving relationships with God and each other. As a church, we value relationships with each other and with our community. All are welcome!"

== Plans to demolish ==
In March 2016, the City of Charlotte gave a go-ahead to demolish the building. Plans to rebuild on the site have been discussed.

== Building Plans Updated ==
New plans have been updated and approved; the new SouthPark Church building is currently under construction.
